The  Ferrocarril Sonora–Baja California is a former railroad line of Mexico that built the line from Mexicali, Baja California, to Benjamín Hill, Sonora in 1948. It interchanged with the Southern Pacific Railroad at Calexico, California, and with the Ferrocarril del Pacifico in Benjamin Hill, Sonora. Before 1960, The SP-controlled Inter-California railroad provided trackage rights for the SBC from Pascualitos to the International Border. SBC took control of that part after the demise of the Inter-Cal.

SBC provided passenger and freight service throughout its existence. It was headquartered in Mexicali, B.C. and had major repair and overhaul shops for its equipment in the town of Benjamin Hill, Sonora. From 1970 into the FNM merger, the SBC also controlled the 44-mile freight-only "Ferrocarril Tijuana y Tecate" UB line from border to border. SP, Kyle Railways and later the San Diego and Imperial Valley Railroad operated the line, paying a fee to the SBC, and later to FNM.

It was absorbed into Nacionales de México in 1987, thus becoming a fallen-flag. The last passenger train from Mexicali to Benjamin Hill operated in 1997. Today the line continues to provide daily modern freight service, including intermodal. It is now known as Ferromex's Puerto Penasco Subdivision and designated by the SCT as the "U" and "UA" lines of the Mexican rail system.

S-BC F Unit Roster

See also
List of Mexican railroads
Ferrocarriles Nacionales de Mexico
Ferromex

References

External links
 Mexlist

Sonora-Baja California
Sonora-Baja California
History of Baja California
History of Sonora
Transportation in Baja California
Transportation in Sonora
Railway companies established in 1948
1987 disestablishments in Mexico
Railway lines opened in 1948
Railway companies disestablished in 1987
Mexican companies established in 1948